Karamyshevo is a rural locality (a settlement) in Dankovskoye Rural Settlement, Kashirsky District, Voronezh Oblast, Russia. The population was 61 as of 2010.

Geography 
Karamyshevo is located 23 km south of Kashirskoye (the district's administrative centre) by road. Rozhdestvenno is the nearest rural locality.

References 

Rural localities in Kashirsky District, Voronezh Oblast